Canadian pop rock band Marianas Trench has released five studio albums, three extended plays, 22 singles and 24 music videos. The band recorded and released their debut EP in 2002, entitled Marianas Trench containing 8 tracks.

On October 3, 2006, the band released their debut album, Fix Me. Its first single, "Say Anything" peaked at number three in the Canadian Singles Chart. It was followed by another two singles, "Decided to Break It" and "Shake Tramp".

On February 24, 2009, they released their second studio album, Masterpiece Theatre. The album debuted at number four on the Canadian Albums Chart and was certified platinum in Canada. The album released five singles, including the highest peaked single of the album, "All to Myself", which peaked at number 11. "All to Myself" and "Cross My Heart" were both certified 2× platinum, the highest certification the band ever received.

The band's third studio album, Ever After, was released on November 21, 2011. The album peaked at number 8 in Canada but also charted in the US in Heatseekers Albums with a peak of number 5 and in Independent Albums with number 48. Its first single, "Haven't Had Enough", peaked at number 9 in Canada. Ever After also released another three singles, "Fallout", "Desperate Measures" and "Stutter".

The band released their fourth studio album, Astoria, on October 23, 2015. Its release was preceded by the promotion of two buzz singles – "Pop 101" and "Here's to the Zeros" – from their extended play, Something Old / Something New. The album's proper lead single, "One Love", was released September 14, 2015.

Albums

Studio albums

Live albums

Extended plays

Singles

Promotional singles

Other charted songs

Videography

Video albums

Music videos

Notes

References

Discographies of Canadian artists
Rock music group discographies